Chloroselas argentea, the silver gem, is a butterfly in the family Lycaenidae. It is found in Zimbabwe (the Mutare and Harare districts). The habitat consists of Brachystegia woodland.

Adults are on wing from October to April.

The larvae feed on Brachystegia spiciformis and possibly Acacia species.

References

Butterflies described in 1932
Chloroselas
Endemic fauna of Zimbabwe
Butterflies of Africa